James Price (6 February 1917 – 22 September 2005) was a Welsh civil engineer, mathematician and author. Price was the chief resident engineer on several large-scale engineering projects, including the M1 and M3 motorways,

Education
Price was a national scholar studying engineering mathematics. In the summer higher exams of 1935, he was ninth in the county. Price graduated from the University of Liverpool in 1938 with a Bachelor of Engineering. He joined the Institution of Civil Engineers in 1942 at the age of 25, following examinations he had taken pre-emptively in the summer of 1940. At the same time, Price was recommended for promotion to  assistant civil engineer (A.C.E.). In 1942, he became a Master of Engineering.

Career
Price was chosen as the chief resident engineer on the first section of the M1, working with Sir Owen Williams KBE and minister for transport Harold Watkinson. The opening took place on 2 November 1959. King Charles III, then Prince of Wales, visited the site during its construction; Price, whom the prince had never met, was invited to meet him, which he did and describes in the following excerpt from Price's Progress: The Tortuous Journey of a Roving Civil Engineer:

In the early 1960s, Price took up the position of senior resident engineer for the leading British electrical engineering consultancy engineers Merz & McLellan, who had started a scheme in the interest of reclaiming land owned by the London Brick Company in Peterborough. This became known as the Peterborough Dust Disposal Scheme.

From 1967 to 31 December 1968, Price was the resident engineer for the Tilbury Grain Terminal, which was completed on schedule. From 1 January 1969, he served as chief resident engineer for the first M3 motorway contract in Surrey County in 1969.

Works

Engineering
1951–1959 – M1 Motorway phase one
1956–1967 – M1 Motorway phase two
1961 – Peterborough Dust Disposal Scheme
1967–1968 – Tilbury Grain Terminal
1969–1974 – M3 Motorway phase one
1971 – A30 road
1974 – M3 Motorway phase two

Publications
1990 – Price's Progress: The Tortuous Journey of a Roving Civil Engineer
1994 – Passages in paradise

References

1917 births
2005 deaths
People from Flint, Flintshire
Alumni of the University of Liverpool
Transport engineers
Welsh civil engineers
20th-century Welsh writers
Fellows of the Institution of Civil Engineers